The Road to Hell: Part 2 is the fifteenth studio album by British singer-songwriter Chris Rea, released in 1999, ten years after The Road to Hell. The single released for the album was "New Times Square". There was also a Japanese edition with the songs "Be My Friend" and "Driving Home for Christmas" included as tracks. It reached #54 position in UK album charts, and was certified Silver by BPI.

Track listing 
All songs by Chris Rea, except Track two by Martin Ditcham and Chris Rea.
 "Can't Get Through" – 8:17
 "Good Morning" – 5:23
 "E" – 6:06
 "Last Open Road" – 3:46
 "Coming off the Ropes" – 5:44
 "Evil No. 2" – 5:34
 "Keep on Dancing" – 4:23
 "Marvin" – 5:04
 "Firefly" – 4:42
 "I'm in My Car" – 4:39
 "New Times Square" – 4:46
 "The Way You Look Tonight" – 5:12 (not included on UK edition)

The Japanese edition included -
"The Way You Look Tonight" – 5:12
"Be My Friend" – 4:57
"Driving Home for Christmas" – 4:00

Personnel 
 Chris Rea – vocals, keyboards, guitars, arrangements 
 Sylvin Marc – bass
 Martin Ditcham – drums
 Kiadan Quinn – drum programming
 Bud Beadle – saxophone
 Julie Isaac – backing vocals
 Debbie Longworth – backing vocals

Production 
 Kiadan Quinn – producer
 Neil Amor – engineer
 Arun Chakraverty – mastering
 Tommy Willis – guitar and amplifier technician
 Tony Lodge – illustrations

Charts

Certifications

References

1999 albums
Chris Rea albums
East West Records albums